, also  is a mountain in the Daikō Mountain Range on the border between the prefectures of Mie and Nara, Japan. Walking trails from the Nara side start from a car park at about 1400 metres. The mountain is famous for wild deer, and also for wild birds, especially wrens and Japanese robins, as well as treecreepers and woodpeckers. In 1980, an area of 36,000 hectares in the region of Mount Ōdaigahara and Mount Ōmine was designated a UNESCO Man and the Biosphere Reserve.

The mountain was also selected by the Tokyo Nichi Nichi Shimbun and Osaka Mainichi Shimbun as one of the 100 Landscapes of Japan in 1927.

See also
 The 100 Views of Nature in Kansai

References

External links 

 Odaigahara - Kamikitayama Village (Japanese)

Odaigahara
Odaigahara
Biosphere reserves of Japan
Cultural Landscapes of Japan